Braeburn Airport, also known as the Cinnamon Bun Airstrip , in the Yukon, Canada, is adjacent to the Klondike Highway between Whitehorse and Carmacks. It is next to Braeburn Lodge (famous for its oversized cinnamon buns and sandwiches) and near Braeburn Lake. It receives no maintenance and pilots are advised to use caution as there are numerous holes in the runway caused by gophers.

References

External links
 Page about this aerodrome on COPA's Places to Fly airport directory

Registered aerodromes in Yukon